is a town located in Mii District, Fukuoka Prefecture, Japan.

As of April 30, 2017, it has an estimated population of 15,567 and a density of 680 persons per km². The total area is 22.83 km².

Tachiarai is divided into three neighborhoods: Ozeki, Hongō and Kikuchi. Much of the land is used for growing rice and other crops.

History 
Tachiarai was home to an Imperial Japanese Army Air Force Base, established in 1919 and the Tachiarai Army Flight School, established in 1940, before American bombers destroyed them in 1945.

Tachiarai houses a Defense Intelligence Headquarters signals intelligence facility, which is used to monitor communications from transiting satellites, as part of a program codenamed MALLARD.

Kakure Kirishitan community 
Tachiarai was home to a community of Japanese hidden Christians (Kakure Kirishitans) who were present in the area since the 16th century, centered in the village of Imamura. They were one of the very few Kakure Kirishitan communities in Kyushu outside present-day Nagasaki prefecture. The community was quite successful in remaining hidden, avoiding being targeted by any crackdowns during the Edo period (1603-1867), when Christianity was either partially or completely banned. As other Kakure Kirishitan communities, the so-called "Imamura Christians" had unique practices and beliefs, such as the cult of a saint-like figure called "Joan Mataemon" whose historicity remains unascertained.

In 1867, the community was "discovered" by Christians from Urakami, triggering a process of conversion to Roman Catholicism. This attracted attention from the local authorities as Christianity was still banned in Japan, resulting in a large number of arrests, although all Christians were released by 1868. By 1912, there were 2,712 Catholics in Tachiarai, but those began to emigrate en-masse to Brazil and later to other South American countries. In contrast to its centuries of hiding in Japan, Tachiarai's Catholic diaspora was highly active in Brazil, having participated in the foundation of the Colégio São Francisco Xavier in São Paulo, which for decades was the most renowned educational institution for Brazilian nikkeis, and of churches in the cities of Registro and Promissão.

The present-day Brick Gothic Imamura Church was constructed with materials donated from Germany and inaugurated in 1913. In 2006, it was declared as a Tangible Cultural Heritage of Fukuoka prefecture, and in 2015, an Important Cultural Property of Japan.

Attractions

Education 
The Tachiarai Board of Education is located near Ozeki train station, and is titled "Dream Center".

There is one junior high school and four elementary schools in Tachiarai. There are also a number of nursery schools, and one private English school.

References

External links

Tachiarai official website 

Towns in Fukuoka Prefecture